Sheridan Street is a Tri-Rail commuter rail station in Hollywood, Florida. The station is located near the intersection of Sheridan Street (SR 822) and North 29th Avenue, just west of Interstate 95 at Exit 21. The station opened to service March 15, 1996. A large park and ride lot is located at this station.

Station layout
The station has two side platforms, with parking and buses east of the northbound platform and a crossover accessing the southbound platform.

External links
 
 South Florida Regional Transportation Authority - Sheridan Street station
 Station from Sheridan Street from Google Maps Street View

Tri-Rail stations in Broward County, Florida
Railway stations in the United States opened in 1996
Buildings and structures in Hollywood, Florida
1996 establishments in Florida